The Central District of Germi County is in Ardabil province, Iran. At the 2006 census, its population was 48,790 in 10,528 households. The following census in 2011 counted 47,449 people in 12,178 households. At the latest census in 2016, the district had 43,990 inhabitants living in 12,869 households.

References 

Germi County

Districts of Ardabil Province

Populated places in Ardabil Province

Populated places in Germi County